Alexios (or Alexius) Branas or Vranas (died 1187) was a Byzantine nobleman, attempted usurper, and the last Byzantine military leader of the 12th century to gain a notable success against a foreign enemy.

Background
Alexios Branas was a notable Greek aristocrat, who was doubly linked to the imperial Komnenos family. He was the son of Michael Branas and of Maria Komnene, who was the great-niece of Alexios I Komnenos. He himself married Anna Vatatzaina, the niece of Manuel I Komnenos. Anna's sister, Theodora Vatatzaina, was also Manuel's lover. The Branas family had been prominent in the city and region of Adrianople since the middle of the 11th century. Another prominent family in the same city were the Vatatzes, into which Alexios Branas was married. Branas was described by a contemporary as "Small in stature, but colossal in the depth and the deviousness of his understanding  and by far the best general of his time".

Successful Campaigns
Branas was one of relatively few prominent Byzantine generals never to raise a rebellion against Andronikos I Komnenos. As a reward for loyalty, Branas was raised to the exalted rank of protosebastos by Andronikos I. Branas led several successful campaigns on his behalf, against the forces of Béla III of Hungary in 1183 during the Byzantine–Hungarian War, and against a rebellion in north-west Anatolia led by Theodore Kantakuzenos, centred on the cities of Nicaea, Prussa and Lopadion. Following the fall of Andronikos I and the elevation of Isaac II Angelos, in 1185, Branas achieved his greatest success in war when fighting against the Siculo-Norman invaders under William II of Sicily. At the Battle of Demetritzes he gained an overwhelming and decisive victory, which effectively ended the Norman threat to the Empire.

Rebellion and death
Branas held the new emperor Isaac II Angelos in contempt, this, combined with his successes as a general and connections to the former imperial dynasty of the Komnenoi, emboldened him to aspire to the throne.

In 1187, Branas was sent to counter the Vlach-Bulgarian Rebellion and Niketas Choniates praised him for his deeds against the rebels. This time, in contrast to his loyalty to Andronikos I, he did rebel; he was proclaimed emperor in his native city of Adrianople, where he mustered his troops and gained the backing of his kinsmen. Branas then advanced on Constantinople, where his troops gained an initial success against the defending army. However, he was unable to pierce or bypass by the city's defences, or suborn the defenders, and could not gain entry by any means.
The imperial forces led by Conrad of Montferrat, the emperor's brother-in-law, made a sortie. The troops of Branas began to give way under pressure from Conrad's heavily equipped infantry. In response Branas personally attacked Conrad, but his lance thrust did little harm. Conrad then unhorsed Branas, his lance striking the cheekpiece of Branas' helmet. Once on the ground, Alexios Branas was beheaded by Conrad's supporting footsoldiers. With their leader dead, the rebel army fled the field. Branas' head was taken to the imperial palace, where it was treated like a football, and was then sent to his wife Anna, who (according to the historian Niketas Choniates) reacted bravely to the shocking sight.

Children
It was probably after his death that his son, Theodore Branas, became the lover of the dowager Empress Anna (Agnes of France): they were together by 1193 according to the Western chronicler Alberic of Trois-Fontaines. Theodore was appointed Caesar and created hereditary lord of Adrianople by the Latin Empire. Alexios Branas also had a daughter, probably named Eudokia, who married Isaac Angelos, son of the sebastocrator John Doukas.

References

Sources
Angold, M. (1984) The Byzantine Empire 1025-1204: A Political History, Longman, Harlow.

Further reading
 

 

12th-century births
12th-century Byzantine people
12th-century Greek people
1187 deaths
Byzantine generals
12th-century Byzantine military personnel
Byzantines killed in battle
Byzantine usurpers
Protosebastoi